Prof. Kabir Ahmad Jaisi was born 16 November 1934 at Jais in District Raebarely, Uttar Pradesh. He got his early education in Azamgarh at Shibli High School and Shibli Inter College. He joined the AMU in 1961 for his graduation. He topped the list of the successful candidates in B.A (1963). He did his M.A. Persian (1965), and Ph.D (1973) from the Aligarh Muslim University, Aligarh. He died 7 January 2013.

He was the 2008 recipient of the Saadi Literary Award.

Awards
 University Gold Medal for standing 1st in B.A, 1963
 U.P Urdu Academy Award for his following books
Sahra sahra, 1972
 Baz Ghast, 1975
 Trikh-e- Adabiyat-e-Tajikistan, 1977
 Allama Iqbal Musleh-Quran-e-Akhir, 1982
Chand Iran Shinas, 1993
 Nawoosh(Lahore) Award, 1986
 Soviet Land Nehru Award, 1989 
 MIR Award, 1993
 Certificate of Merit(By President of India), 1994
 Fakhruddin Ali Ahmad Ghalib Award, 2006
(for Persian Research and Criticism)

References

 Prof. Kabeer Ahmad Jaisi
 کبیر احمد جائسی
 AMU holds condolence meeting for Prof. Kabir Ahmad Jaisi 

Scholars from Uttar Pradesh
People from Raebareli district
Recipients of the Saadi Literary Award
1934 births
2013 deaths
Aligarh Muslim University alumni
People related to Persian literature
People from Amethi district